The inaugural Asian Athletics Championships  were held in 1973 at the Rodriguez Sports Center in Marikina, Rizal, Philippines from November 18–23, 1973.

Medal summary

Men's events

Women's events

Medal table

External links
GBR Athletics

References

Asian Athletics Championships
Asian Championships
Sports in Metro Manila
Asian Championships in Athletics
Asian Championships in Athletics
International athletics competitions hosted by the Philippines